The Little Siskiwit River is a  river on Isle Royale in Lake Superior, in the U.S. state of Michigan.

See also
List of rivers of Michigan

References

Michigan  Streamflow Data from the USGS

Rivers of Michigan
Rivers of Keweenaw County, Michigan
Tributaries of Lake Superior
Isle Royale